The OFW OK-15 was a 1950s Austrian two-seat light aircraft. Designed by Otto Kauba and built by the Österreichische Flugzeugwerke GmbH (OFW) at Wiener Neustadt, it was the first aircraft to be designed and built in Austria for 20 years.

Design and development

The OK-15 was a light sports monoplane of conventional design with a low wing, enclosed side-by-side two-seat cockpit and fixed undercarriage with tailwheel. It was manufactured using traditional materials of metal, wood and fabric, and stressed for aerobatics.

The only prototype was registered OE-VAM and first flown on 16 July 1956. Subsequent fight tests showed its handling to be unsatisfactory and it was not put into production.

Specification

References

1950s Austrian civil utility aircraft
Single-engined tractor aircraft
Low-wing aircraft
Aircraft first flown in 1956